Amrita Schools of Engineering are private engineering schools in India part of Amrita Vishwa Vidyapeetham University which is spread across its five campuses in Amritapuri (Kollam), Bengaluru, Chennai, Coimbatore, and Amaravati.  The schools offer undergraduate, integrated degree, postgraduate, and doctoral programmes in various engineering disciplines.

Amrita Schools of Engineering conduct Amrita Engineering Entrance Exam (AEEE) along with Joint Entrance Examination – Main for admission to B.Tech programs and M.Tech admissions are based on Graduate Aptitude Test in Engineering.

The schools were founded by Mata Amritanandamayi Devi in 1994, and are managed by her international humanitarian organization Mata Amritanandamayi Math.

History 
 
The Amrita School of Engineering, Coimbatore was established in 1994, in the village of Ettimadai at the foothills of Bouluvanpatty ranges, about 20 km away from the Coimbatore city. It was the first higher educational institution to be set up by the Mata Amritanandamayi Math, which at then had only 120 students and 13 faculty members. As Amrita's first campus, it is still home to the administrative headquarters of Amrita University.

Later in 2002, two new campuses were opened with schools of engineering at Bengaluru, and Amritapuri. While the Bengaluru campus sits in Kasavanahalli, a neighbourhood in south-west of the Bengaluru metropolis, the Amritapuri campus was set up in the village of Vallikavu, next to the international headquarters of the Mata Amritanandamayi Math.

In 2003, Amrita Vishwa Vidapeetham became one of the youngest universities to be conferred the status of a deemed university.

In 2019, an engineering school started operating in the newly established Chennai campus, at the outskirts of the Chennai city in the village of Vengal.

In 2021, an engineering school started operating in its new campus at Amaravati, the capital city of Andhra Pradesh.

Campuses

Amrita School of Engineering, Amritapuri 

The school of engineering in the Amritapuri campus started in 2002, and ranked as the 20th best engineering college in India according to National Institutional Ranking Framework by the Government of India and it has Computer Science, Electrical & Electronics, Electronics & Communication, and Mechanical Engineering departments.

Amrita School of Engineering, Bengaluru 

The school of engineering in the Bengaluru campus has Computer Science, Electrical & Electronics, Electronics & Communication, Mechanical Engineering departments alike in the Amritapuri campus, both of which were established together in 2002.

Amrita School of Engineering, Chennai 
The school of engineering in the Chennai campus is second youngest of among the five, and started functioning in 2019. It has Civil, Computer Science, Electrical & Electronics, Electronics & Communication, Cyber Security Mechanical Engineering departments.

Amrita School of Engineering, Coimbatore 
The school of engineering in Coimbatore campus predates the university, and in 1994 became the first higher-education institution to be set up by the Mata Amritanandamayi Math. Being the headquarters of the University, it has the largest intake of students annually, and offers the most number of programs among the five engineering schools of Amrita. Among the five, It is also the only school to have Aerospace and Chemical Engineering Departments. Other than that, the school has Civil, Computer Science, Electrical & Electronics, Electronics & Communication and Mechanical Departments. It is also the headquarters of the Centre for Excellence in Computational Engineering and Networking.

Rankings

Amrita School Of Engineering was ranked 16th among Engineering institutions in India in 2021 by NIRF.

Academics

Academic programmes 
The schools of Engineering offer undergraduate, postgraduate, Integrated and doctoral courses in various engineering disciplines affiliated to Amrita Vishwa Vidyapeetham. All the programmes are approved and come under the regulations of the AICTE, and the school of engineering is accredited by NAAC and NBA.

B.Tech Admission 
The admissions to all the B.Tech programmes offered at Amrita Schools of Engineering is done through Amrita Engineering Entrance Examinaton (AEEE) and JEE Main. While 60% of the seats are reserved for AEEE candidates, the rest are allotted for students applying with their JEE Main (BE/BTech) common rank. Admission for foreign nationals, NRI and PIO students is through SAT. The candidates based on their ranks are invited for counselling at any of the campuses, where they are allowed to choose branch and campus available, and book their seats. The candidate must have completed Class 12 or HSE or equivalent from recognized Board or University with compulsory subjects of English, Mathematics, Physics and any one of the technical subject prescribed by AICTE with minimum 60% aggregate to be eligible to apply for AEEE. The age of the candidate should be less than 21 years at the time of Admission.

AEEE 
Amrita Engineering Entrance Examination (AEEE) is an annual multiple-choice entrance test conducted in April and May in various centres across India. Similar to the JEE-Main, the test assesses candidates on high school topics from mathematics, physics and chemistry along with small proportion of English profiency and Aptitude and Reasoning. Candidates can attempt the Computer Based Test (CBT) at the centers all over India and abroad, after registering for the exams.

The preparation, syllabus, weightage and pattern of the examination is similar to that of JEE-Main.

M.Tech Admission 
M.Tech Admission is based on Graduate Aptitude Test in Engineering and personal interview. Candidate with B.Tech or equivalent (4 years) or Master of Science, from recognized University with minimum 75% aggregate are eligible to apply.

Scholarships 
The schools offer scholarships as fee waiver for B.Tech students, based on the rank scored in the JEE main and entrance examination. The student admitted through scholarship has to score minimum CGPA as per the university rules in order to earn the fee waiver in the subsequent years, or his scholarship is passed on to the next eligible student. Scholarships for M.Tech students is based on GATE score.

References 

1994 establishments in Tamil Nadu
Educational institutions established in 1994
Universities and colleges affiliated with the Mata Amritanandamayi Math
Private engineering colleges in Tamil Nadu